Southern blueberry is a common name for several plants native to the southeastern United States and may refer to:

Vaccinium formosum
Vaccinium tenellum